My Friend Ganesha is a 2007 Indian Hindi-language film written and directed by Rajiv S Ruia and produced by Deepak Bhanushali, Manish Ruparel, Raman Trikha, Mitesh Mehta, and Ronak Bhagat. It stars Ahsaas Channa, Kiran Janjani,  Shital Shah and Upasana Singh.

Plot
Ashu, an 8-year-old boy feels lonely since his parents, Aditya and Aarti, don't have time for him and he doesn't have any friends. As the story moves on Lord 'Ganesha' becomes his friend and together they resolve so many problems around and have a lot of fun.

Aarti and Aditya are too involved in their daily lives and hence cannot give much time to the boy who always feels lonely. He would only get to be with the maid. On one rainy day, the boy saves a drowning mouse and saves his life. He brings the small mouse home and tells the maid about it. She is very happy and tells the boy that he has saved Lord Ganesha's pet ride. Gangubai explains to him the full episode of Lord Ganesha & Mushakraj and also that he is his friend. Ashu gets sad and tells Gangubai that he is also alone and needs a friend on which she tells him that Ganesha can be his friend. The boy gets excited at this thought. It was a period when the family was going through a crisis & was coinciding with the forthcoming Ganesha Festival. Gangubai somehow convinces everyone to bring Ganesha home for this festival. Ashu is very excited, Ganesha comes into their home and things start turning around in their family. Ganesha becomes Ashu's friend and together with him solves various problems in their family and has a lot of fun these 11 days.

Cast
 Ahsaas Channa as Aashu
 Kiran Janjani as Aditya 'Adi', Aashu's father
 Shital Shah as Aarti, Aashu's mother
Arun Bakshi as Aashu's Principal
Mushtaq Khan as Police Inspector Patil
Upasana Singh as Gangu Taai
Rachit Trehan as Anwar (Assistant Bank Manager)
Saurabh Singh as Karan, Aditi's boyfriend 
 Anil Nagrath as a wicked Businessman (Aarti's boss)
 Sanatan Modi as Bank Boss (Aditya's boss)
Aarya Vora as Aditi, Aditya's sister
Master Vedaant Phaterpekar as Monty
Rajan Verma as Kaaliya

Sequels 
My Friend Ganesha has been followed by three sequels, all directed by Rajiv S Ruia. A sequel My Friend Ganesha 2 was released on 22 August 2008. A third film in the series My Friend Ganesha 3 was released on 26 March 2010. These were followed by My Friend Ganesha 4 in 2013.

References

External links 
 

2007 films
2000s Hindi-language films
Hindu devotional films
Indian films with live action and animation
Indian children's films
Hindu mythology in popular culture
Ganesha in popular culture
Indian mythology in popular culture